Do Daran (also Romanized as Do Darān; also known as Do Darān-e ‘Olyā) is a village in Hoseynabad-e Goruh Rural District, Rayen District, Kerman County, Kerman Province, Iran. At the 2006 census, its population was 152, in 37 families.

References 

Populated places in Kerman County